The Swedish ice hockey champions is a title awarded annually to the winning playoff team of the top-tier ice hockey league in Sweden, which currently is the Swedish Hockey League (SHL) since 1975. It was first awarded to IK Göta in 1922, the championship's inaugural year. The championship's present SHL format did not take into effect until the league was originally formed for the 1975–76 season under the name of Elitserien. A team who wins the Swedish Championship is awarded the Le Mat Trophy. Djurgårdens IF holds the most titles in history with 16 titles, but Färjestad BK, who's played all 45 seasons of the current top-tier league, is the most successful SHL team with ten championship titles. The most recent Swedish Champions are also Färjestad BK, who won their tenth title in club history in 2022.

Before 1953, the Swedish champions were determined through a standalone tournament, the Swedish Ice Hockey Championship, where teams could submit their participation. In other words, the leagues were not connected with the Swedish Championship during this period. Between 1953 and 1955, the winner was decided through matches between the winners of Division 1 Norra and Division 1 Södra. From 1956 to 1965, the Swedish champions was the winner of a second round group stage following Division 1. In the years of 1966 and 1967 a play-off was played between Division 1 teams and the 1968 season saw a return to second round group stage. In the 1975–76 season, the Elitserien was started and the winner of the Elitserien (now named the SHL) playoffs became the Swedish ice hockey champions.

Previous winners

Title champions 

Champions since the formation of the Swedish Hockey League (formerly named Elitserien) in 1975:

Notes

References

See also
List of Swedish ice hockey junior champions
Marathon standings for the top Swedish ice hockey league
Marathon SHL standings
List of SHL seasons